On either side of the urethral crest is a slightly depressed fossa, the prostatic sinus, the floor of which is perforated by numerous apertures, the orifices of the prostatic ducts from the lateral lobes of the prostate.

References

External links
  - "The Male Pelvis: The Prostate Gland"
 

Prostate